William George Storm (1826–1892) was a Canadian architect who designed a number of prominent monuments in Toronto, Ontario.

He was born in England and immigrated to Canada while still a child and was raised in Cobourg, Ontario. His father was a contractor and introduced him to the building trade. He apprenticed first under William Thomas and then under Frederick William Cumberland. Storm and Cumberland eventually formed a partnership, and the firm became one of the most prominent in nineteenth century Toronto. The firm won many of the city's most important commissions, including expanding Osgoode Hall, the chapel of St. James-the-Less, the tower of St. James Cathedral, and University College.

Storm and Cumberland's partnership dissolved in acrimony in 1871. Storm also encountered serious health problems that left him without work and confined to hospital. A friendship with Emerson Coatsworth gained Storm commission to design new elementary schools across the city. One of these buildings, today Inglenook Community High School, survives today. He then won a commission to build St. Andrew's Church. Perhaps his most noted building is the Richardsonian Romanesque main building for Victoria College.

Storm was a leading Mason and was Master of St. Andrew's Lodge No. 16 in 1858 and 1859.  He was also a founder of the local Commandery of Knights Templar. Masonic symbolism is incorporated into a number of his structures. He was also a founding member of the Ontario Association of Architects, and served as its first president. He was a founding member of the Royal Canadian Academy of Arts.

He died suddenly of a stroke in 1892.

Works

References
Storm, William George Dictionary of Canadian Biography.

1826 births
1892 deaths
People from Cobourg
19th-century Canadian architects
Members of the Royal Canadian Academy of Arts